Geoffrey Jameson (18 August 1928 – 8 November 2017) was an Australian wrestler. He competed at the 1956 Summer Olympics and the 1960 Summer Olympics.

References

External links
 

1928 births
2017 deaths
Australian male sport wrestlers
Olympic wrestlers of Australia
Wrestlers at the 1956 Summer Olympics
Wrestlers at the 1960 Summer Olympics
People from the Riverina
Sportsmen from New South Wales
Commonwealth Games medallists in wrestling
Wrestlers at the 1954 British Empire and Commonwealth Games
Wrestlers at the 1958 British Empire and Commonwealth Games
Commonwealth Games gold medallists for Australia
Commonwealth Games silver medallists for Australia
20th-century Australian people
21st-century Australian people
Medallists at the 1954 British Empire and Commonwealth Games
Medallists at the 1958 British Empire and Commonwealth Games